Durgapur is a census town in Chandrapur district  in the state of Maharashtra, India.

Geography 
It has an average elevation of 204 metres (669 feet).

Demographics 
 India census, Durgapur had a population of 17,369. Males constitute 50% of the population and females 50%. Durgapur has an average literacy rate of 74%, higher than the national average of 59.5%: male literacy is 81% and, female literacy is 66%. In Durgapur, 14% of the population is under 6 years of age.

References 

Cities and towns in Chandrapur district